Dresden-Stetzsch station is a railway station in the Stetzsch district in the capital city of Dresden, Saxony, Germany.

References

Stetzsch